Mostyska Raion was a raion in Lviv Oblast in western Ukraine. Its administrative center was Mostyska. The raion was abolished on 18 July 2020 as part of the administrative reform of Ukraine, which reduced the number of raions of Lviv Oblast to seven. The area of Mostyska Raion was merged into Yavoriv Raion.

It was established in 1939 along with the entire Lviv Oblast following the Soviet invasion of Poland.

At the time of disestablishment, the raion consisted of three hromadas:
 Mostyska urban hromada with the administration in Mostyska;
 Shehyni rural hromada with the administration in the selo of Shehyni;
 Sudova Vyshnia urban hromada with the administration in the city of Sudova Vyshnia.

See also
 Administrative divisions of Lviv Oblast

References

External links
 Mostyska district 2006 info Мостиської райдержадміністрації budget highlights. 

Former raions of Lviv Oblast
1939 establishments in Ukraine
Ukrainian raions abolished during the 2020 administrative reform